Noyelles-lès-Humières is a commune in the Pas-de-Calais department in the Hauts-de-France region of France.

Geography
Noyelles-lès-Humières lies about 20 miles (32 km) southeast of Montreuil-sur-Mer, on the D106 and D98 road junction.

Population

Places of interest
 The seventeenth century church of St. Martin.

See also
Communes of the Pas-de-Calais department

References

Noyellesleshumieres
Artois